Leonard Marchand is a justice of the British Columbia Court of Appeal. He is the son of Donna Par and politician Leonard Marchand.

Early life 
Marchard is Syilx and a member of the Okanagan Indian Band. He grew up in Kamloops, B.C.

He graduated from the University of British Columbia in 1986 with a B.A.Sc. in chemical engineering. He worked in the oil industry for five years before attending law school at the University of Victoria, graduating in 1994.

Career 
From 1995 to 2013, he practiced law at Fulton & Company LLP in Kamloops, where his practice focused on the liability of public authorities, including by advancing civil claims for abuses suffered by residential school survivors.

Notably, in 2005, he helped negotiate and was a signatory to the Indian Residential Schools Settlement Agreement. He served on the Oversight Committee for the Independent Assessment Process and on the Chief Adjudicator's Reference Group.

Marchard was asked to serve on the Selection Committee to make recommendations on appointments to the Truth and Reconciliation Commission.

In 2013, he was appointed to the Provincial Court of British Columbia. He was appointed to the Supreme Court of British Columbia in 2017. He also presided in Kamloops Cknucwentn First Nations Sentencing Court in Kamloops. In 2021, he was appointed to the British Columbia Court of Appeal.

References 

Judges in British Columbia
University of British Columbia alumni
University of Victoria alumni
Syilx people
Living people

Year of birth missing (living people)